Bajai LSE is a Hungarian football club located in Baja, Hungary. It currently plays in Hungarian National Championship III. The team's colors are yellow and blue.

External links 
 Official website 
 Soccerway

Football clubs in Hungary
Association football clubs established in 1972
1972 establishments in Hungary